Frankfort is a village in Amathole District Municipality in the Eastern Cape province of South Africa. Also known as eDonqaba.

Village 51 km north-east of King William’s Town. It developed from a settlement of members of the British-German Legion in 1857 and is named after Frankfurt in Germany.

References

Populated places in the Amahlathi Local Municipality
German settlements in South Africa
1857 establishments in the Cape Colony